Augustine James Cummins (27 October 1886 – 1967) was a British weightlifter. He competed in the men's featherweight event at the 1924 Summer Olympics.

References

External links
 

1886 births
1967 deaths
British male weightlifters
Olympic weightlifters of Great Britain
Weightlifters at the 1924 Summer Olympics
Place of birth missing
20th-century British people